WW domain-binding protein 1 is a protein that in humans is encoded by the WBP1 gene.

The globular WW domain is composed of 38 to 40 semiconserved amino acids shared by proteins of diverse functions including structural, regulatory, and signaling proteins. The domain is involved in mediating protein-protein interactions through the binding of polyproline ligands.

This gene encodes a WW domain binding protein, which binds to the WW domain of Yes kinase-associated protein by a conserved region: XPPXY motif. The function of this protein has not been determined.

References

Further reading